John Miglarese (born 10 June 1978) is an American soccer manager who currently serves as an assistant coach of Major League Soccer club St. Louis City SC.

Playing career
Miglarese played college soccer at Georgia Southern University, making 47 appearances across four years at the school.

Coaching career
Miglarese has managed at a number of colleges throughout his career, including Covenant College, John Brown University, King University, and the University of North Carolina at Pembroke. His first non-college head coaching job was a two-year stint with the Southern West Virginia King's Warriors in the former PDL.

Miglarese joined USL League Two team Tormenta FC in early 2017, leading the club to a Deep South Division championship in 2018. During their first season in the newly-formed USL League One, Miglarese led the team to a sixth place finish and a 9-10-9 record. On September 16, 2020, after Tormenta began their season with a 2-4-4 record, Miglarese was moved from his head coaching role to become the technical director and Vice President of Soccer Performance.

Miglarese began serving as St. Louis City SC assistant coach for the club's inaugural MLS season in 2023.

Managerial statistics

References

1978 births
Living people
Association football goalkeepers
American soccer coaches
American soccer players
Georgia Southern Eagles men's soccer players
USL League Two coaches
USL League One coaches
Tormenta FC
Milligan Buffaloes men's soccer coaches
Milligan Buffaloes women's soccer coaches
Georgia Southern Eagles men's soccer coaches
Gardner–Webb Runnin' Bulldogs men's soccer coaches
John Brown Golden Eagles men's soccer coaches
King Tornado men's soccer coaches
UNC Pembroke Braves men's soccer coaches